Hiaki High School is a public charter high school on the Pascua Yaqui Native American reservation in Tucson, Arizona. It is operated by CPLC Community Schools.

References

Public high schools in Arizona
Schools in Tucson, Arizona
Charter schools in Arizona
2005 establishments in Arizona